Choora  (in Hindi-Urdu) or Chuda or Chudlo (in Gujarati) is a set of bangles traditionally worn by a bride on her wedding day and for a period after, especially in Indian weddings.

Materials and appearance
The choora is usually red and white; sometimes the red bangles are replaced with another colour, but they are usually only two colours.  They are traditionally made of ivory, with inlay work, though now made with plastic. Traditionally there are 21 bangles, although more recently the bride often wears 7, 9 or 11 bangles. The bangles range in size according to the circumference of the top of the forearm and the wrist end so that the set fits neatly.

Gujarati Chudlo 
In Gujarati tradition, the bridal bangles are referred to as Chudlo (ચૂડલો). Traditionally they were made using elephant's tusks/ivory and were known as "Haathi Daant no Chudlo". These bangles are gifted to the bride by her maternal uncle "Maama".

Chudlo is generally paired with Gujarati bridal saree known as Panetar. These Chudlo bangles are generally red and green in color to match the Panetar Saree. Chudlo has great significance in Gujarati culture as is evident several folk songs like "Chudlo Lyado Ji Meera Bai Pehar Lyo" and "Radha Chudlo Perje Mara Naam Nu".

Marathi Hirva Chuda 
Hirva Chuda, peacock green colored Chuda bangles are preferably worn by Marathi brides. The green is the color of fertility and is associated with Devi (Hindu Goddess). In the Devi shrines of Tuljabhavani and Renukadevi, the Goddesses are adorned using Hirva Chuda. The Marathi tradition of Hirva Chuda during marriage is akin to wearing green bangles during Hariyali Teej in North India. Sometimes, green bangles are also paired with red bangles. The hirva chuda (green bangles) are worn after the haldi oil bath, given by a suvasini and are worn for a year.

Nepali Chura 
Chooda is often spelled as Chura in Nepali. A Nepali chura set is usually made of red colored gilded bangles. Chura bangles are often paired with pote (beaded necklace). Chura bangle sets are also worn during Teej celebrations as is evident from Nepali Teej songs like Chura Tika Laali.

Customary use
Wearing the chooda is primarily a Indian Hindu tradition which is also followed by other Indian religious communities culturally. Sindhoor and Mangalsutra are other adornments worn by married women. The custom is widely observed in Jammu, Himachal, Punjab, Uttarakhand, Haryana, Gujarat, Rajasthan and Madhya Pradesh, Uttar Pradesh. The chooda ceremony  is held on the morning of the wedding or the day before. The bride's maternal uncle and aunt give her a set of choodiyan.

Traditionally, the bride would wear a chooda for a full year, although if a newly wed bride became pregnant before her first anniversary, the choora was taken off. When the color started to fade, her in-laws would actually have it re-colored, so everyone would know that she had been married for less than a year. On an auspicious holiday, usually sankranti, after the first anniversary her in-laws would hold a small intimate ceremony in which the choora was removed and glass choodiyan (bangles) were placed on both hands. This usually was accompanied with mithai (Indian sweets) and a monetary shagun. The chooda then was taken to a river and a prayer was said and it was left to float onto the water.  Afterwards the woman could wear other chooda in any colour for as long as she liked.

It is now normal for the bride to wear her chooda for a month and a quarter (40 days). As the chooda is made of fragile materials, Indian custom has it that the bride may refrain from heavy housework in her marital home to keep it intact for the 40 days, as a kind of honeymoon. After that, in traditional homes at least, she takes over the lion's share of domestic work from her mother-in-law.

References 

Bracelets
Hindi words and phrases
Jewellery of India
Marriage in Hinduism
Gujarati culture
Punjabi culture
Punjabi words and phrases
Sikh practices